Shirley H. Petway (July 6, 1908 – December 27, 1984) was an American Negro league catcher in the 1930s and 1940s.

A native of Nashville, Tennessee, Petway played for several teams between 1932 and 1944, including the Birmingham Black Barons, Detroit Stars, and Cleveland Buckeyes. He died in Chicago, Illinois in 1984 at age 76.

References

External links
 and Seamheads

1908 births
1984 deaths
Birmingham Black Barons players
Cleveland Buckeyes players
Detroit Stars (1937) players
Louisville Black Caps players
Nashville Elite Giants players
Baseball catchers
Baseball players from Nashville, Tennessee